Louis Jean Népomucène Lemercier (20 April 1771 – 7 June 1840) was a French poet and playwright.

Life
Lemarcier was born in Paris. His father had been intendant successively to the duc de Penthièvre, the comte de Toulouse and the unfortunate princesse de Lamballe, who was the boy's godmother. Lemercier was a prodigy; before he was sixteen his tragedy of Méléagre was produced at the Théâtre Français. Clarisse Harlowe (1792) provoked the criticism that the author was "pas assez roué pour peindre les roueries" (not enough scamp to depict scamp tricks.) Le Tartufe révolutionnaire a parody full of bold political allusions, was suppressed after the fifth performance.

In 1795, Lemercier's masterpiece Agamemnon, called by Charles Lafitte the last great antique tragedy in French literature, was produced. It was a great success, but was violently attacked later by Julien Louis Geoffroy who stigmatized it as a bad caricature of Prosper Jolyot de Crébillon. Les quatre métamorphoses (1799) was written to prove that the most indecent subjects might be treated without offence. 
The Pinto (1800) was the result of a wager that no further dramatic innovations were possible after the comedies of Pierre Beaumarchais. 
It is a historical comedy on the subject of the Portuguese Revolution of 1640. 
This play was construed as casting reflections on the first consul Napoleon, who had hitherto been a firm friend of the avowed republican Lemercier. His extreme freedom of speech finally offended Napoleon, and the quarrel proved disastrous to Lemercier's fortune for the time. 
In 1803, he earned a severe disappointment on the première of his tragedy Isule et Orovèse which was widely ridiculed and hooted by the public; consequently, at the beginning of the third act Lemercier withdrew his manuscript. He published his text with annoted “hootings” in order to pay deference to his public.

None of his subsequent work fulfilled the expectations raised by Agamemnon, with the exception perhaps of Frédégonde et Brunehaut (1821). 
In 1810, he was elected to the Académie française, where he consistently opposed the romanticists, refusing to vote for Victor Hugo – who was to succeed him in the fauteuil 14. In spite of this, he has some pretensions to be considered the earliest of the romantic school. His Christophe Colomb (1809), advertised on the play-bill as a comédie shakespérienne [sic], represented the interior of a ship, and showed no respect for the classical unities. 
Its numerous innovations provoked such violent disturbances in the audience that one person was killed and future representations had to be guarded by the police.

Lemercier wrote four long and ambitious epic poems: Homère, Alexandre (1801), L'Atlantiade ou la théogonie newtonienne (1812) and Moïse (1823), as well as an extraordinary Panhypocrisiade (1819–1832), a distinctly romantic production in sixteen cantos, which has the sub-title Spectacle infernal du XVIe siècle. 
In it 16th century history, with Charles V and Francis I as principal personages, is played out on an imaginary stage by demons in the intervals of their sufferings.

Lemercier died on 7 June 1840 in Paris. 
He had composed his own epitaph as follows: « Il fut homme de bien et cultiva les lettres. » (“He was a gentleman and a man of letters.”)

Works

Theatre 
1788: Méléagre, tragedy in 5 acts
1792: Clarisse Harlowe, drama, in verse
1795: Le Tartufe révolutionnaire, comedy in 5 acts, in verse
1796: Le Lévite d'Éphraïm, tragedy in 3 acts
1797: Agamemnon, tragedy in 5 acts, presented at the Théâtre de la République 5 floréal an V (24 April)
1797: La Prude, comedy
1798: Ophis, tragedy in 5 acts, presented at the Théâtre de la République 2 nivôse an VII 
1800: Pinto, ou la Journée d'une conspiration, historical comedy, created at the Théâtre de la République 1 germinal an VIII (22 March)
1803: Isule et Orovèse, tragedy in 5 acts
1808: Baudouin, empereur, tragedy in 3 acts
1808: Plaute ou la Comédie latine, comedy in 3 acts, in verse, presented at the Comédie-Française, 20 January
1809: Christophe Colomb, historical comedy in 3 acts, in verse, presented at the Théâtre de S. M. l'Impératrice et Reine, 7 March
1816: Charlemagne, tragedy in 5 acts, presented at the Comédie-Française, 27 June
1816: Le Frère et la Sœur jumeaux, comedy in 3 acts, in verse, presented at the Théâtre de l'Odéon, 7 November
1817: Le Faux bonhomme, comedy in 3 acts tombée dès le commencement du 3e act, presented at the Théâtre français, 25 January
1817: Le Complot domestique, ou le Maniaque supposé, comedy in 3 acts and in verse, presented at the Théâtre de l'Odéon, 16 June
1818: Ismaël au désert ou l'origine du peuple arabe, scène orientale en vers (1801), presented at the Théâtre de l'Odéon 23 January (under the title Agar et Ismaël, ou l'Origine du peuple arabe)
1820: La Démence de Charles VI, tragedy in 5 acts, meant ti be presented at the Théâtre de l'Odéon 25 September
1820: Clovis, tragedy in 5 acts
1821: Frédégonde et Brunehaut, tragedy in 5 acts, presented at the Second Théâtre français 27 March
1821: Louis IX en Égypte, tragedy in 5 acts, presented at the Second Théâtre français, 5 August
1822: Le Corrupteur, comedy in 5 acts and in verse, completed 22 November, presented at the Second Théâtre-Français, 26 November
1823: Dame Censure, ou la Corruptrice, tragi-comedy in 1 act and in prose 
1824: Richard III et Jeanne Shore, historical drama in 5 acts and in verse, imitated from Shakespeare and Rowe
1825: Les Martyrs de Souli, ou l'Épire moderne, tragedy in 5 acts, inspired by the writings of François Pouqueville.
1826: Camille, ou le Capitole sauvé, tragédy in 5 acts
1828: L'Ostracisme, comedy
 Richelieu ou la journée des dupes, comedy in 5 acts, in verse
1835: L'Héroïne de Montpellier, melodrama in 5 acts, presented at the Théâtre de la Porte-Saint-Martin 7 November
1827: Les Deux filles spectres, melodrama in 3 acts and in prose, représenté au théâtre de la Porte-Saint-Martin 8 Novembre
1830: Les serfs polonais, melodrama in 3 acts, presented at the Théâtre de l'Ambigu 15 June.

Poems and varia 
1789: Épître d'un prisonnier délivré de la Bastille
1798: Les Quatre Métamorphoses
1800: Homère, poem
1800: Alexandre, poem
1801: Les Trois fanatiques, poem
1802: Un de mes songes ou quelques vers sur Paris
1803: Les Âges français, poème en 15 chants 
1804: Hérologues, ou Chants des poètes rois 
1804: L'Homme renouvelé, récit moral en vers
1806: Traduction des Vers dorés de Pythagoras et de deux idylles de Theocritus
1806: Discours de la nature
1807: Épître à Talma
1808: Essais poétiques sur la théorie Newtonienne tirés de l'Atlantiade [...] - Paris : Collin
1812: L'Atlantiade ou la théogonie newtonienne, poème en 6 chants: Bizarre poème didactique où des divinités allégoriques représentent le calorique, l'oxygène, le phosphore, etc.
1812: Ode sur le doute des vrais philosophes
1814: Épître à Bonaparte sur le bonheur de la vertu
1814: Épître à Bonaparte, sur le bruit répandu qu'il projetait d'écrire des commentaires historiques
1815: Réflexions d'un Français, sur une partie factieuse de l'armée française
1818: La Mérovéide ou les champs catalauniques, poème en 14 chants 
1818: Du Second Théâtre-français, ou Instruction relative à la déclamation dramatique
1819: La Panhypocrisiade ou la comédie infernale du XVIe siècle, poème en 16 chants
1819 and 1823: Moïse, poem
1820: Cours analytique de littérature générale, 4 vol. : collection of lessons given at the Athénée from 1811 to 1814.
1820: Chant pythique sur l'alliance européenne
1820: Ode à notre âge analytique
1823: Le Paysan albigeois
1824–1825: Chants héroïques des montagnards et matelots grecs, translated into French verse
 Ode à la mémoire du Comte de Souza
 Almînti, ou le Mariage sacrilège, physiological novel
 Ode à l'hymen, set in music by Luigi Cherubini
 Ode sur la Melpomène des Français

References

External links 
  Népomucène Lemercier on data.bnf.fr

18th-century French poets
18th-century French male writers
19th-century French poets
Writers from Paris
Members of the Académie Française
18th-century French dramatists and playwrights
19th-century French dramatists and playwrights
1771 births
1840 deaths
Burials at Père Lachaise Cemetery